Elton Glaser is an American poet. He has published collections of poetry and been published in literary magazines.

Life
He is a native of New Orleans, is a retired Distinguished Professor Emeritus of English from the University of Akron, and former editor of the Akron Series in Poetry.

He lives in Akron, Ohio.

Awards
 2010 Guy Owen Prize for his poem "Do the Do"
 2009 Guy Owen Prize for his poem "Slow Fuse Around the Cranium"
 2002 Marlboro Prize in Poetry for his poem, "Meditation in Blue and White"
 2002 Crab Orchard Award

Bibliography

Collections

Poems

References

Year of birth missing (living people)
Living people
20th-century American poets
University of Akron faculty
Writers from New Orleans
21st-century American poets